Laysla De Oliveira (born January 11, 1992) is a Canadian actress. She is known for her roles as Dodge in the Netflix series Locke & Key, Veronica in the drama film Guest of Honour, and Becky DeMuth in the horror film In the Tall Grass.

Biography 
De Oliveira was born in Toronto, Ontario, to a family of Brazilian origin. She began a modeling career at the age of 14, but always wanted to be an actress. She studied drama and dance at Rosedale Heights School of the Arts, and once she went to college, she finally acquired an acting agent.

After acting in several television films and direct-to-video films, De Oliveira was cast in Natty Zavitz's romantic drama film Acquainted in 2017 as the character of Emma. The film premiered at the Whistler Film Festival on December 1, 2018.

In August 2018,  De Oliveira was cast as Becky DeMuth in the Netflix horror film In the Tall Grass, directed by Vincenzo Natali and based on the novella by Stephen King and Joe Hill. The film was released on October 4, 2019.

While in Toronto to film In the Tall Grass, Atom Egoyan asked to meet with De Oliveira, leading to her being cast as the starring role of Veronica in the film Guest of Honour. The film premiered at the Venice Film Festival on September 3, 2019.

De Oliveira was announced to be in another adaptation of Joe Hill's work in February 2019, as the antagonist role of Dodge in the Netflix series Locke & Key, based on the graphic novels of the same name. While filming the show, she also reunited with Vincenzo Natali, who directed the last two episodes of the first season. The first season was released on Netflix on February 7, 2020. De Oliveira was very excited to play a villain role for the first time, and the character of Dodge greatly appealed to her because of her unapologetic nature to be evil, which is something rarely seen in roles given to female actors. De Oliveira was inspired by Angelina Jolie's performance as the title character in Maleficent for her portrayal of Dodge.

Filmography

Film

Television

References

External links 
 
Laysla De Oliveira on Instagram

1992 births
Living people
Actresses from Toronto
Canadian people of Brazilian descent
Canadian people of Portuguese descent
Canadian people of Croatian descent
Canadian television actresses
Canadian film actresses
Actresses of Brazilian descent
21st-century Canadian actresses